Mick Blue is an Austrian pornographic actor and director.

Career 
In January 2005, Blue signed an exclusive performing and directing contract with Zero Tolerance Entertainment. His directorial debut was titled Meet the Fuckers. He has also directed for Elegant Angel using the stage name Grazer. In June 2015, Blue, Anikka Albrite and Maestro Claudio formed the production label BAM Visions for Evil Angel.
In 2017, Blue announced his new racing career via YouTube, stating that it was his childhood dream to become a racing driver. Although he originally aimed to enter the IndyCar Series by 2020, on September 20, 2022, he took first place in the National Auto Sport Association TT6 event in Laguna Seca, California, becoming the national champion for that category. Blue characterized his performance as “the biggest accomplishment I have reached in my racing career and it means the world to me.”

Mainstream media appearances 
Blue starred in an Austrian documentary film titled Porno Unplugged. He also played a DJ in the 2015 mainstream Austrian film Chimney or Pit.

Blue was placed on CNBC's list of "The Dirty Dozen: Porn's biggest stars" in 2016.

Personal life 
Blue married American pornographic actress Anikka Albrite in 2014.

In 2015, Blue and Albrite won AVN Awards for Male and Female Performer of the Year, making them the first married couple in AVN Awards history to ever win both awards simultaneously.

On September 12, 2022, Blue revealed on his Official Instagram Page that he is a practitioner of Brazilian jiu-jitsu having trained under Fábio Leopoldo. On December 16, 2022, he was awarded the rank of black belt.

Awards

References

External links 

 
 
 Mick Blue Official Instagram Page
 
 
 "4 Porn Stars Talk About How They Fell in Love"

1976 births
Actors from Graz
Austrian expatriate sportspeople in the United States
Austrian male models
Austrian male pornographic film actors
Austrian pornographic film directors
Austrian racing drivers
Film people from Graz
Living people
Male adult models
Sportspeople from Graz